Psilosticha mactaria is a species of moth of the family Geometridae. It is found in New South Wales and Tasmania.

References

Boarmiini
Moths of Australia
Moths described in 1857
Taxa named by Achille Guenée